was a town located in Higashikubiki District, Niigata Prefecture, Japan.

As of 2003, the town had an estimated population of 4,016 and a density of 44.39 persons per km². The total area was 90.47 km².

On April 1, 2005, Matsudai, along with the town of Matsunoyama (also from Higashikubiki District), the town of Kawanishi, and the village of Nakasato, both from Nakauonuma District, was merged into the expanded city of Tōkamachi.

Transportation

Railway
 Hokuetsu Express Hokuhoku Line

Highway

Local attractions
Matsudai is one of the sites of the Echigo-Tsumari Art Triennial, first held in 2000. The Matsudai Snow-Land Agrarian Culture Centre (aka Matsudai Nobutai) was built in 2003 by architects MVRDV as part of the Triennial and is the focal point for local contemporary art activities. The centre includes an event space, classroom, gallery, art shop, and restaurant.

Dissolved municipalities of Niigata Prefecture
Tōkamachi, Niigata